The following is a list of television channels broadcast in Romania.

National

State-owned 
TVR – Televiziunea Română
 TVR 1 (HD) – general
 TVR 2 (HD) – general
 TVR 3 – general
 TVR Cultural – cultural
 TVR Info (HD) – news
 TVR Moldova – general (TVR for Moldova)
 TVR International – international

Private 
CME
 PRO TV (HD) – general
 PRO TV Internațional – international
 PRO TV Chișinău – general
 acasă (HD) – feminine public
 PRO Arena (HD) – sports and male-oriented programming
 PRO Cinema (HD) – movies
 acasă Gold (HD) – movies

Intact
 Antena 1 (HD) – general
 Antena Stars (HD) – entertainment
 Antena 3 CNN (HD) – news
 Happy Channel (HD) – feminine public
 Antena International (HD) – international
 ZU TV (HD) – music

CNM
 Național TV – general
 Național 24 Plus – general
 Favorit TV – folk music

Clever Group
 Prima TV (HD) – general
 Prima Sport (HD) – sports
 Prima Sport 2 (HD) – sports
 Prima Sport 3 (HD) – sports
 Prima Sport 4 (HD) – sports
 Prima Sport 5 (HD) – sports
 Prima Sport PPV 1 (HD) – sports
 Prima Sport PPV 2 (HD) – sports
 Prima Sport PPV 3 (HD) – sports
 Prima Sport PPV 4 (HD) – sports
 Agro TV – agriculture
 Prima News (HD) – news
 Prima Comedy (HD) – entertainment
 Profit News (HD) – business news
 Cinemaraton (HD) – Romanian movies
 Medika TV – wellness

Kiss TV Music SRL
 Kiss TV (HD) – music
 Magic TV (HD) – oldies
 Rock TV (HD) – rock music

Mixmontan SRL
 Travel Mix (HD) – tourism

Other TV channels
 Kanal D (HD) – general
 Euronews Romania – news
 TVSudEst – general
 Telestar 1 – general
 Kapital TV – general
 Nașul TV – general
 Linkpress TV – general
 Inedit TV – general
 B1 TV – news
 Realitatea Plus – news
 România TV – news
 NCN – news
 Money News – business news
 Canal 33 (HD) – lifestyle
 Cinethronix – documentaries
 IDA TV (HD) - architecture and design
 Top Shop TV – teleshopping
 Etno TV (HD) – folk music
 Taraf TV (HD) – music
 Trinitas TV – religious
 Speranța TV – religious
 Credo TV – religious
 Alfa Omega TV –  religious
 Angelus TV - religious

Satellite & Cable 
Digi Communications
 Digi Animal World (HD) – documentaries
 Digi 24 (HD) – news
 Digi Life (HD) – lifestyle
 Digi Sport 1 (HD) – sport
 Digi Sport 2 (HD) – sport
 Digi Sport 3 (HD) – sport
 Digi Sport 4 (HD) – sport
 Digi World (HD) – documentaries
 Film Now (HD) – movies
 Hora TV (HD) – ethnic culture
 Music Channel (HD) – music
 HIT Music Channel (HD) – music
 U TV (HD) – music

Warner Bros. Discovery Romania
 Discovery Channel (HD) – documentaries
 Discovery Science (HD) – science
 ID Investigation Discovery (HD) – investigations
 DTX (HD) – documentaries
 TLC – life
 Animal Planet Europe (HD) – documentaries
 Eurosport 1 (HD) – sports
 Eurosport 2 (HD) – sports
 Travel Channel (HD) – documentaries
 Food Network (HD) – gastronomy
 Cartoon Network – cartoons
 Boomerang – cartoons
 TNT (HD) – movies

HBO Romania
 HBO (HD) – movies
 HBO 2 (HD) – movies
 HBO 3 (HD) – movies
 Cinemax (HD) – movies
 Cinemax 2 (HD) – movies

Antenna Group
 AXN (HD) – series
 AXN White – series
 AXN Black – series
 AXN Spin – series

Paramount Global
 Nickelodeon (HD) – cartoons
 Nick Jr. – cartoons
 Nicktoons – cartoons
 TeenNick – teenagers
 Comedy Central – series
 MTV Global – music

AMC Networks International
 Extreme Sports Channel – sports
 Film Cafe (HD) – movies
 AMC (HD) – movies
 TV Paprika (HD) – gastronomy
 CBS Reality – documentaries
 JimJam – cartoons
 Minimax – cartoons

Fox International Channels
 National Geographic Channel (HD) – documentaries
 National Geographic Wild (HD) – documentaries
 Baby TV – cartoons

Disney–ABC Television Group
 Disney Channel – teenagers
 Disney Junior – cartoons

Viasat Romania
 TV1000 – movies
 Epic Drama (HD) – series
 Viasat Explore (HD) – documentaries
 Viasat History (HD) – history
 Viasat Nature (HD) – documentaries

BBC Studios
 BBC Earth (HD) – documentaries

Tematic Media Group
 The Fishing & Hunting Channel (HD) – fishing and hunting

NBCUniversal
 DIVA – movies
 E! Entertainment (HD) – entertainment

A&E Television Networks
 History (HD) – history
 Crime + Investigation – investigations

Telekom Romania
 Telekom Sport (HD) – sports

Others
 Auto Motor und Sport Channel (HD) – sports
 TV5Monde Europe – general
 Fashion TV – fashion
 Balkanika MTV – music from the Balkans
 Duck TV (HD) – cartoons
 Da Vinci Learning – children's education
 Trace Sport Stars (HD) – sports

Local

State-owned 
TVR – Televiziunea Română
 TVR Iași – regional
 TVR Craiova – regional
 TVR Cluj – regional
 TVR Timișoara – regional
 TVR Tîrgu-Mureș – regional

CNM
 TTV – regional

See also 
 Television in Romania

References 

Television in Romania
Romania
Television stations

bg:Списък на телевизиите в Румъния